The 2010 Banja Luka Challenger was a professional tennis tournament played on outdoor red clay courts. It was the ninth edition of the tournament which was part of the 2010 ATP Challenger Tour. It took place in Banja Luka, Bosnia and Herzegovina between 13 and 21 September 2010.

ATP entrants

Seeds

 Rankings are as of August 30, 2010.

Other entrants
The following players received wildcards into the singles main draw:
  Nikola Čačić
  Marko Djokovic
  Roko Karanušić
  Sven Lalić

The following players received entry from the qualifying draw:
  Mirza Bašić
  Ilya Belyaev
  Cătălin Gârd
  Jürgen Zopp

Champions

Singles

 Marsel İlhan def.  Pere Riba, 6–0, 7–6(4)

Doubles

 James Cerretani /  David Škoch def.  Adil Shamasdin /  Lovro Zovko, 6–1, 6–4

External links
Official site
ITF Search 

Banja Luka Challenger
Banja Luka Challenger
2010 in Bosnia and Herzegovina sport